The Second Cold War is an ongoing state of political tension. It may also refer to:

Cold war (general term), a list of various tensions called "Cold War"
Cold War (1979–1985), the second phase of the Cold War between the Eastern and Western Blocs, sometimes labelled the "Second Cold War"
Cold War 2 (film), a 2016 film
Cold War II (ice hockey), an ice hockey game